Public offices and most private businesses in Nepal operate six days a week and only close on Saturdays. International organizations have their own rules and are normally closed on Saturdays and Sundays. Government holidays for the upcoming year are published in Nepal Gazette. Nepal celebrates a number of religious and non-religious holidays. On most of these holidays, most government offices and private institutions are closed, although is not mandatory for privately owned businesses to close and international organizations may operate their own calendar.

Some of these events are region, religion, or gender-specific. For example, a certain holiday in Nepal can only be for women.

The Government of Nepal has decided to grant a Nation-Wide holiday for a total of 31 days in the year 2079 B.S

The longest consecutive public holiday in Nepal is during Vijaya Dashami. On this festival, holidays fall consecutively i.e. from Fulpati to Duwadashi for seven days. Ghatasthapana and Kojagrat Purnima holidays are part of this festival but are separate from the six-day holiday. These festival holidays do not fall on the same calendar date every year, as they are celebrated on the basis of Lunar dates also known as tithi. Holidays such as Loktantra Diwas (Democracy Day) and Republic day are celebrated on the basis of Bikram Sambat calendar dates.

Public holidays

The following is the list of holidays for the calendar year 2018 in Nepal.

Islamic

See also 
 List of festivals in Nepal

References

External links

Nepal
Holidays